Ricardo Jorge Fernandes Pinto (born 12 June 1993 in Matosinhos) is a Portuguese footballer who plays for Leixões S.C. as a  goalkeeper.

Football career
On 22 January 2014, Pinto made his professional debut with Leixões in a 2013–14 Segunda Liga match against Sporting B.

References

External links

Stats and profile at LPFP 

1993 births
Living people
Portuguese footballers
Association football goalkeepers
Liga Portugal 2 players
Leixões S.C. players
Sportspeople from Porto District